Bad Rothenfelde is a municipality and health resort in the district of Osnabrück, in Lower Saxony, Germany.

It is situated in the Teutoburg Forest, approx. 20 km southeast of Osnabrück, between Hilter and Dissen.

Bad Rothenfelde has a spa, hospitals, clothes shops and many cafés.

References

Osnabrück (district)
Spa towns in Germany